Rahul Kumar Paswan (born 19 April 1998) is an Indian professional footballer who plays as a forward for Mohammedan in the I-League.

Club career

East Bengal
In January 2022, East Bengal announced the signing Paswan for the remainder of the Indian Super League season. He made his only appearance on 14 February, in a 1–0 loss against Kerala Blasters.

Mohammedan
In June 2022, Paswan joined I-League club Mohammedan. On 16 August, he made his debut for the club against Goa in the Durand Cup, which ended in a 3–1 comeback win. Eleven days later, he scored his first goal for the club against Indian Air Force, in a 2–0 win. Paswan executed a wonderful spot jump from a Marcus Joseph cross to nail a header into the back of the goal.

Career statistics

Club

References

External links 
Rahul Paswan at ESPN
 Rahul Paswan at ISL official website

1998 births
Living people
Indian footballers
Footballers from West Bengal
Association football forwards
Indian Super League players
I-League players
East Bengal Club players
Mohammedan SC (Kolkata) players